Carter Lane is a historic street in the City of London, running slightly south of Ludgate Hill and St. Paul's Cathedral. The modern Carter Lane is shown in three sections, named Shoe Makers Row, Great Carter Lane, and Little Carter Lane, on a London map of 1746.

The Rising Sun, a pub at 61 Carter Lane, is a Grade II listed building built in the early/mid-19th century. St. Paul's Cathedral School had an 1875 building located on Carter Lane, which is now a Youth Hostel (36, Carter Lane).

References

External links
 

Grade II listed pubs in the City of London